Wrotham is a rural locality in the Shire of Mareeba, Queensland, Australia.

Geography
The Mitchell River forms the northern boundary. The Walsh River flows through from the south to the north-west corner, where it joins the Mitchell.

Road infrastructure
The Burke Developmental Road (State Route 27) passes through from south-east to west.

References 

Shire of Mareeba
Localities in Queensland